Richard Arlen Osborne (born October 31, 1953) is a former American football tight end who played for four seasons in the National Football League (NFL). He was drafted by the Philadelphia Eagles in the ninth round of the 1976 NFL Draft, but was waived during the 1976 season. He was claimed off waivers by the New York Jets, and was traded back to Philadelphia the following year in exchange for a future draft pick. He played for the Eagles from 1976–1978, the Jets in 1976, and the St. Louis Cardinals in 1979. He played college football at Texas A&M.

Osborne played his high school football at Robert E. Lee High School in San Antonio where he earned all-state honors as a wide receiver. He helped lead the Lee Volunteers to a 28-27 1971 UIL 4A State title over Wichita Falls high school.   Tommy Kramer who had a long NFL career was his quarterback in high school.   Another notable teammate in high school was Pat Rockett who also earned all-state honors and later played Major League Baseball for the Atlanta Braves.

References

1953 births
Living people
Players of American football from Kansas
Texas A&M Aggies football players
Philadelphia Eagles players
New York Jets players
St. Louis Cardinals (football) players